Michael Graeme Farrell (born 24 September 1968) is an Australian cricket coach and former cricketer who played for Tasmania. Farrell was a talented off spinning all-rounder, who seemed well suited to the one day game. His career lasted from 1989 until 1998.

He later coached the Tasmanian under-19 side.

External links
 

1968 births
Living people
Tasmania cricketers
Australian cricketers
Cricketers from Melbourne
Australian cricket coaches